Eugène Rychlak Jr. (1968 – 26 July 2019) was a powerlifter from the United States, who specialized in the bench press.

Career
Rychlak's bodyweight was in excess of 345 lb (156 kg). Rychlak previously held the record for the world's heaviest assisted bench press of 1010 lb (457 kg) December 16, 2006 in Lake George, NY. This record is now held by Ryan Kennelly, who has lifted 1075 lbs in the same lift.

At the 2005 Mr. Olympia bodybuilding competition, Rychlak attempted to break his own record by pressing 1015 lb (460 kg). Rychlak was unable to complete the press, and despite having several spotters around him, the weight fell onto his body.  Rychlak suffered no serious injuries from the accident.

Rychlak has also squatted  in competition.

Death 
Gene Rychlak died on July 26, 2019, due to a heart condition.

See also 
 Progression of the bench press world record
 Scot Mendelson
 Ryan Kennelly

References

External links
 Gene Rychlak Power Systems - The official website

1968 births
2019 deaths
American powerlifters
World record holders in weightlifting
People from Montgomery County, Pennsylvania